The South Sudan Air Force (SSAF), also previously known as the Sudan People's Air Force or Sudan People's Liberation Air Force, is the air force of the South Sudan People's Defense Forces (SSPDF) of South Sudan. The headquarters are located in Juba Air Base, Juba.

History

Sudan: 2008–2011
On 24 June 2008, the South Sudan Air Force was formally created by the Southern Sudan Legislative Assembly, although it didn't have any aircraft at that time. The U.S. Air Force Special Operations School announced in July 2009 that Sudan participated in the Building Partner Aviation Capacity Course. In May 2010, Major General Kuol Dim Kuol of the Sudan People's Liberation Army said: "SPLA has formed a nucleus air force and navy. Our pilots and engineers have been trained, and local support and administrative units will follow suit."

On 8 August 2010, the South Sudanese government impounded a Mi-8, Mi-17 variant from SudanAir as an effort to stop smuggling of weapons in the South, a few days before delivery of the first SSAF Mi-17s.
 
British magazine Jane's Defence Weekly said in September 2010 that "Bloomberg News had reported earlier that the fleet consisted of nine Mi-17V-5 transport helicopters and one Mi-172 variant, purchased for a total US$75 million from Russia's Kazan Helicopters, in a contract negotiated in May 2007 for deliveries set to begin in March 2010." The deal was reported to be worth US$75 million; deliveries of the first eight aircraft had taken place by December 2010, with the helicopters delivered to Juba Airport in Antonov An-124 transports, with the remaining two aircraft were delivered in January 2011. Nine of the helicopters were Mi-17V-5s configured for transport, with the remaining aircraft being a Mi-172 configured for VIP transport.

South Sudan: 2011–present
On 11 January 2011, President Salva Kiir launched the region's air force as the South Sudan Air Force in the presence of senior officials of the Government of Southern Sudan (GoSS) and foreign diplomats. The SPLA purchased its first batch of 10 Mil Mi-17 helicopters from Kazan, a Russian supplier, and ordered unarmed aircraft for transport purposes.

On 13 September 2014, six air force military officers and engineers of the Sudan People's Liberation Army (SPLA) loyal to South Sudanese president Salva Kiir Mayardit have joined the rebels or SPLM-IO, saying their decision to join the SPLM/A-in Opposition is a result of lack of diversity in the army of training opportunities and poor promotion policy. The deserted SPLA personnel also said that the government of South Sudan used the air force to transport militias and SPLA regular soldiers who participated in the killing of innocent civilians in Juba late last year.

On 25 November 2015, the South Sudanese government launched an aerial campaign on rebel positions in a SPLA-IO's designated area in Mundri County of Western Equatoria State. It was said that the South Sudan Air Force unleashed helicopter gunships and attacked the designated cantonment area of the rebels. The action was a violation of the ceasefire deal and the security arrangements signed by the two parties (GRSS and SPLA-IO).

Organisation
The air force is divided into 2 wings.

Helicopter Unit 
Equipped with Mi-17V-5s, Mi-35s and a Mi-172
Fixed Wing Unit
Equipped with 2 L-39s

Key dates
June 24, 2008 – South Sudan Air Force formally created.
February 2010 – first fixed-wing aircraft received – Beech 1900.
December 2010 – first helicopters received – Mi-17.

Aircraft and bases

Current inventory 

It is difficult to ascertain a list and number of aircraft types operated by the air force of South Sudan because of secrecy.

Aircraft orders 2010-2015
The first aircraft was received in February 2010, and the first helicopters from an initial order for 10 was received in December 2010.

Bases
Headquarters – Juba Air Base.

Air Force commanders

24 May 2017 – 15 December 2017: Charles Lam Chol
15 December 2017 – present: James Kong Kong

References

Military of South Sudan
Military units and formations established in 2011
Military aviation in Africa